Douglas John Smylie (June 3, 1922 – March 19, 1983) was a Canadian football player who played for the Toronto Argonauts, Montreal Alouettes and Ottawa Rough Riders. He won the Grey Cup with Toronto in 1945 and 1952. The son of Rod Smylie, a player and Stanley Cup winner for the Toronto St. Patricks. Previously played football for and attended Cornell University.

Douglas married Constance Fellowes August 23, 1947.

References

1922 births
Canadian football people from Toronto
Players of Canadian football from Ontario
Toronto Argonauts players
Montreal Alouettes players
Ottawa Rough Riders players
1983 deaths
Cornell University alumni